Chlorida curta is a species of beetle in the family Cerambycidae. It was described by James Thomson in 1857. It is known from French Guiana, northern central Brazil, and Ecuador.

References

Bothriospilini
Beetles described in 1857